The Krishak Sramik Janata League is a political party in Bangladesh formed by Bangabir Kader Siddiqui, a renowned war hero who leaded the Kaderia Bahini during the Bangladesh's Liberation War of 1971, after he left Awami League in 1999. Although, the party adopted the Mujibist ideology, which is the ideology of Awami League, the party of Sheikh Mujib. The district of Tangail, which was headquarters of the Kaderia Bahini, is known as the "stronghold" of the party. 

Most of the members of the party are Mujibists and ideologized by the Bangladesh Liberation War. The general secretary of the party is Habibur Rahman Talukdar, who got the Bir Protik award for his contributions in the liberation war. Kader Siddique is still the president of the party. 

In the 2001 parliamentary election, the party won 1 out of 300 direct seats in the Sangsad. It joined the Jatiya Oikya Front on 5 November 2018 before the 2018 general elections. Although it left the alliance in 2019. Kader Siddique later stated that "joining the Jatiya Oikya Front led by Kamal Hossain was the greatest mistake of his life".

Electoral history

Jatiya Sangsad elections

References

Political parties in Bangladesh
Political parties with year of establishment missing